Kjellbergiodendron is a genus of the botanical family Myrtaceae, first described as a genus in 1936. It contains only one known species, Kjellbergiodendron celebicum, endemic to the Island of Sulawesi in Indonesia.

References

Myrtaceae
Monotypic Myrtaceae genera
Endemic flora of Sulawesi
Taxa named by Max Burret